Concave or concavity may refer to:

Science and technology
 Concave lens
 Concave mirror

Mathematics
 Concave function, the negative of a convex function
 Concave polygon, a polygon which is not convex
 Concave set
 The concavity of a function, determined by its second derivative

See also